The Canterbury Magicians is the women's representative cricket team for the New Zealand region of Canterbury. They play their home games at Hagley Oval, Christchurch. They compete in the Hallyburton Johnstone Shield  one-day competition and the Women's Super Smash Twenty20 competition. They are the most successful side in the history of the Hallyburton Johnstone Shield, with 39 title wins.

History
Canterbury played their first recorded match in 1932, against Otago, which they won by five runs. They played in their first Hallyburton Johnstone Challenge Shield in 1938–39, where they lost to Wellington. After another failed attempt at winning the Challenge Shield a year later, they were victorious at their next attempt, in 1943–44, beating Auckland and Wellington. They defended their title in both of the next two tournaments.

Over the next twenty-five years, Canterbury added five Shield titles to their honours: in 1955–56, 1960–61, 1961–62, 1963–64 and 1966–67. Canterbury were victorious two more times in the early 1970s, before becoming the dominant force in the country from the 1978–79 season: they won 20 out of 21 titles between 1978–79 and 1998–99, only missing out in 1989–90, when they came second to Wellington. In 1962–63, Canterbury competed in the Australian Women's Cricket Championships.

Following their period of domination, they finished second to Auckland four times in a row before regaining the title in 2003–04, shared with Wellington as the final was rained-off. The won the title outright the following season, and three times in a row between 2006–07 and 2008–09. Wins came again in 2010–11, 2012–13, 2016–17 and most recently in 2020–21 with captain Frances Mackay hitting 94* to lead them to victory over Auckland. They are the most successful side in the history of the Hallyburton Johnstone Shield, with 39 title wins.

Canterbury have also played in the Super Smash Twenty20 competition since 2007–08. They won the inaugural competition, and five more times since, in 2010–11, 2011–12, 2015–16, 2020–21 and 2022–23. Their wins in 2007–08, 2010–11 and 2020–21 meant that they won the double of the Hallyburton Johnstone Shield and the Super Smash. Canterbury all-rounder Frances Mackay has been the leading run-scorer in the Super Smash three times, in 2015–16, 2016–17 and 2018–19, and was the leading wicket-taker in 2015–16 and 2020–21.

Grounds
Canterbury have used various grounds throughout their history. Hagley Oval, Christchurch has remained their primary ground since their first home game against Otago in 1933. They also used Lancaster Park and St Andrew's College Ground in their early history.

In the 1970s, Canterbury began using Burnside Park, Christchurch and Porritt Park. From the 1998–99 season, they started using a larger number of grounds, such as Dudley Park, Rangiora, Village Green, Christchurch and Redwood Park, Christchurch. In 2017–18, Canterbury began playing in Lincoln, mainly at Lincoln Green. In the 2021–22 and 2022–23 seasons, their primary grounds were the Hagley Oval and the MainPower Oval, which they have used since 2006–07.

Players

Current squad
Based on squad announced for the 2022–23 season. Players in bold have international caps.

Notable players
Players who have played for Canterbury and played internationally are listed below, in order of first international appearance (given in brackets):

 Margaret Marks (1935)
 Ruth Symons (1935)
 Peg Taylor (1935)
 Phyl Blackler (1948)
 Esther Blackie (1949)
 Verna Coutts (1954)
 Mary Rouse (1954)
 Joyce Currie (1954)
 Evon Dickson (1957)
 Joyce Dalton (1958)
 Loretta Bayliss (1961)
 Pat Moore (1961)
 Jackie Lord (1966)
 Janice Stead (1966)
 Pat Carrick (1969)
 Shirley Cowles (1969)
 Jenny Olson (1969)
 Ann McKenna (1969)
 Ethna Rouse (1972)
 Sue Rattray (1973)
 Vicki Burtt (1977)
 Sheree Harris (1978)
 Karen Marsh (1978)
 Sue Brown (1979)
 Lesley Murdoch (1979)
 Debbie Hockley (1979)
 Nicki Turner (1982)
 Ingrid Jagersma (1984)
 Delwyn Costello (1985)
 Karen Gunn (1985)
 Nancy Williams (1985)
 Brigit Legg (1987)
 Kirsty Bond (1988)
 Nicola Payne (1988)
 Jennifer Turner (1988)
 Debbie Ford (1988)
 Catherine Campbell (1988)
 Pauline te Beest (1990)
 Maia Lewis (1992)
 Sarah McLauchlan (1992)
 Tania Woodbury (1992)
 Trudy Anderson (1993)
 Lisa Astle (1993)
 Sarah Illingworth (1995)
 Katrina Keenan (1995)
 Justine Russell (1995)
 Delwyn Brownlee (1995)
 Karen Le Comber (1996)
 Helen Daly (1996)
 Kate Pulford (1999)
 Claire Taylor (1998)
 Haidee Tiffen (1999)
 Helen Watson (1999)
 Terry McGregor (1999)
 Paula Flannery (2000)
 Erin McDonald (2000)
 Emily Travers (2000)
 Rowan Milburn (2000)
 Lisa Sthalekar (2001)
 Mandie Godliman (2002)
 Fiona Fraser (2002)
 Sara McGlashan (2002)
 Rebecca Steele (2003)
 Sarah Burke (2003)
 Maria Fahey (2003)
 Beth McNeill (2004)
 Sarah Tsukigawa (2006)
 Sophie Devine (2006)
 Selena Charteris (2007)
 Amy Satterthwaite (2007)
 Rachel Candy (2007)
 Stacy-Ann King (2008)
 Emma Campbell (2010)
 Erin Bermingham (2010)
 Kate Ebrahim (2010)
 Fran Wilson (2010)
 Kelly Anderson (2011)
 Frances Mackay (2011)
 Lea Tahuhu (2011)
 Janet Brehaut (2011)
 Kyshona Knight (2013)
 Chinelle Henry (2013)
 Hayley Jensen (2014)
 Vanessa Watts (2014)
 Thamsyn Newton (2015)
 Meg Kendal (2016)
 Samantha Haggo (2019)

Coaching staff

Head Coach: Rhys Morgan

Honours
 Hallyburton Johnstone Shield:
 Winners (38): 1943–44, 1944–45, 1945–46, 1955–56, 1960–61, 1961–62, 1963–64, 1966–67, 1972–73, 1975–76, 1978–79, 1979–80, 1980–81, 1981–82, 1982–83, 1983–84, 1984–85, 1985–86, 1986–87, 1987–88, 1988–89, 1990–91, 1991–92, 1992–93, 1993–94, 1994–95, 1995–96, 1996–97, 1997–98, 1998–99, 2004–05, 2006–07, 2007–08 , 2008–09, 2010–11, 2012–13, 2016–17, 2020–21; shared (1): 2003–04
 Women's Super Smash:
 Winners (6): 2007–08, 2010–11, 2011–12, 2015–16, 2020–21, 2022–23

See also
 Canterbury cricket team

Notes

References

Women's cricket teams in New Zealand
Cricket in Canterbury
Super Smash (cricket)